Devendra Mahadevrao Bhuyar is an Indian politician in the Swabhimani Paksha party. He was elected as a member of the Maharashtra Legislative Assembly from Morshi on 24 October 2019.

He shot to limelight as he defeated two term MLA Dr. Anil Bonde, a leader of Bharatiya Janata Party, former Agriculture Minister of Maharashtra state & national general secretary of B.J.P. Kisan morcha.

References

Living people
Members of the Maharashtra Legislative Assembly
Swabhimani Paksha politicians
Year of birth missing (living people)